South Wight  was a non-metropolitan district with the status of a borough on the Isle of Wight in England from 1974 to 1995.

The district was formed by the Local Government Act 1972, and was a merger of Sandown-Shanklin and Ventnor urban districts and Isle of Wight Rural District. It was one of two districts on the island formed in 1974 – the other was Medina.

Following a review by the Local Government Commission for England, the borough was abolished on 1 April 1995, when a single Isle of Wight Council replaced the island's county council and two district councils.

See also
South Wight Borough Council elections

References

Former non-metropolitan districts of the Isle of Wight
Former boroughs in England